Alona sketi is a species of crustacean in family Chydoridae. It is endemic to Slovenia. Its natural habitat is inland karsts.

References

Cladocera
Freshwater crustaceans of Europe
Endemic arthropods of Slovenia
Taxonomy articles created by Polbot
Crustaceans described in 1992